Juan José Zevallos Uriarte (born 7 July 1990) is a Peruvian footballer who plays as a full back. He currently plays for José Gálvez FBC.

Club career
He started his career out with Segunda División Peruana side América Cochahuayco in 2006.

In 2007, he returned to Universitario de Deportes but did not manage to make a league appearance in the Descentralizado.

Then in 2008 he joined Chiclayo based club Juan Aurich. His debut in the Torneo Descentralizado was in Round 6 of the 2008 season at home against Sport Áncash. He played the entire match and helped his side win the match 3–0 at the Elías Aguirre Stadium.

References

1990 births
Living people
Footballers from Lima
Peruvian footballers
Peruvian Primera División players
U América F.C. footballers
Club Universitario de Deportes footballers
Juan Aurich footballers
Total Chalaco footballers
José Gálvez FBC footballers
Association football fullbacks